Opus was a major Czechoslovak state-owned record label and music publishing house based in Bratislava, now known as Opus a.s..

Background
Opus was founded in 1971 and spun off as the Slovak division of music label Supraphon. As such, it was the first Slovak record label. It was privatized in 1990 and purchased by Forza Music s.r.o. in 2005. When Warner Music Group acquired Forza in 2019, they expected to revive the Opus label for pop, rock, and children's music. The label is active to this day and operates under the name Opus a.s.

In addition to Slovak, and later Czech, artists and bands, the label also published works by foreign artists from countries including Poland, Hungary, East Germany, Yugoslavia, and Greece.

Notable artists
 Modus
 Marika Gombitová
 Beáta Dubasová
 Peter Nagy
 Elán
 Miroslav Žbirka
 Alla Pugacheva
 Richard Müller
 Dara Rolins
 Tublatanka
 Vašo Patejdl
 Ján Lehotský
 Lojzo
 Team
 Pavol Hammel
 Metalinda
 Jaroslav Filip
 Dežo Ursiny

References

External links
 Official website

Slovak record labels
Record labels established in 1971
Warner Music labels
Companies of Czechoslovakia
State-owned record labels
1971 establishments in Czechoslovakia